Not to be confused with Roblox Murder Mystery 2

Murder Mystery 2 is an upcoming American  action comedy mystery film directed by Jeremy Garelick and written by James Vanderbilt. It is a sequel to the 2019 film Murder Mystery, and stars Adam Sandler and Jennifer Aniston. 

Murder Mystery 2 is scheduled to be released on March 31, 2023, by Netflix.

Cast 
 Adam Sandler as Nick Spitz, a New York City police officer and Audrey's husband
 Jennifer Aniston as Audrey Spitz, a hairdresser, murder mystery novel enthusiast and Nick's wife
 Mark Strong as an SAS mercenary
 Mélanie Laurent
 Jodie Turner-Smith
 Enrique Arce
 Tony Goldwyn
 Annie Mumolo
 Wilmer Valderrama
 Zurin Villanueva
 Kuhoo Verma
 Adeel Akhtar as Maharajah
 John Kani as Col. Ulenga

Production

Development 
In October 2019, it was announced that a sequel to Murder Mystery was in development with Adam Sandler and Jennifer Aniston reprising their roles. In August 2021, Jeremy Garelick was hired as director, from a script by James Vanderbilt, with filming of the sequel to take place in Paris and in the Caribbean. Sandler and Aniston had confirmed their returns during the September 2021 Tudum Global Fan Event.
 
In January 2022, it was reported that Adeel Akhtar and John Kani would be reprising their roles from the first film, with Mark Strong, Mélanie Laurent, Jodie Turner-Smith, Kuhoo Verma, Enrique Arce, Tony Goldwyn, Annie Mumolo and Zurin Villanueva joining the film as newcomers.

Filming 
Principal photography began in January 2022, in Hawaii. Filming wrapped on April 8, 2022, in Paris, France.

Release 
Murder Mystery 2 is scheduled to be released on March 31, 2023, by Netflix.

References

External links
 
 
 
 

2020s English-language films
2020s American films
2020s comedy mystery films
2023 films
2023 comedy films
American comedy mystery films
American sequel films
Echo Films films
English-language Netflix original films
Films directed by Jeremy Garelick
Films produced by Jennifer Aniston
Films produced by Allen Covert
Films produced by Adam Sandler
Films produced by James Vanderbilt
Films set in the Caribbean
Films set in Paris
Films shot in the Caribbean
Films shot in Hawaii
Films shot in Paris
Films with screenplays by James Vanderbilt
Happy Madison Productions films
Upcoming English-language films
Upcoming Netflix original films
Upcoming films
Upcoming sequel films